The FZI Forschungszentrum Informatik (Research Center for Information Technology), is a non-profit research institute for applied computer science in Karlsruhe, Germany. FZI was established in 1985. FZI has very close collaborations with Karlsruhe Institute of Technology (KIT), but is not affiliated to KIT Karlsruhe.

References

External links 
 

1985 establishments in West Germany
Computer science institutes in Germany
Research institutes established in 1985
Education in Karlsruhe